Deerfield Township is one of the eighteen townships of Portage County, Ohio, United States.  The 2020 census found 2,838 people in the township.

Geography
Located in the southeastern corner of the county, it borders the following townships:
Palmyra Township - north
Milton Township, Mahoning County - northeast corner
Berlin Township, Mahoning County - east
Smith Township, Mahoning County - south
Lexington Township, Stark County - southwest
Atwater Township - west
Edinburg Township - northwest corner

No municipalities are located in Deerfield Township.

Name and history
Deerfield Township was organized in 1806 and takes its name from Deerfield, Massachusetts, the native home of a first settler. Statewide, other Deerfield Townships are located in Morgan, Ross, and Warren counties.

Government
The township is governed by a three-member board of trustees, who are elected in November of odd-numbered years to a four-year term beginning on the following January 1. Two are elected in the year after the presidential election and one is elected in the year before it. There is also an elected township fiscal officer, who serves a four-year term beginning on April 1 of the year after the election, which is held in November of the year before the presidential election. Vacancies in the fiscal officership or on the board of trustees are filled by the remaining trustees.

From 2013 until 2018, the Portage County District Library operated the Deerfield Computer Lab at the Deerfield Township Hall.

References

External links
County website

Townships in Portage County, Ohio
Townships in Ohio